Old Chiang Rai Airport  is a non-active airport near the city of Chiang Rai in Chiang Rai Province, Thailand.

History
In 1926, Chiang Rai Airport was established, making it the first airport in the region and the second in Thailand. Later, during the Pacific War, it was used for transporting military equipment. It was the former base of the 417th Squadron, Royal Thai Air Force. In 1992, it was thought to have been abandoned as the new Mae Fah Luang Airport opened. The runways and its area is currently used for recreational activities and events, being used amongst the locals as a park.

In 2018, the airport was used as a helicopter landing base to support the Tham Luang cave rescue.

See also
Chiang Rai International Airport (Mae Fah Luang International Airport), IATA: CEI, ICAO: VTCT

References

External links
Old Chiang Rai Airport - recent (2008) pictures and commentary

Buildings and structures in Chiang Rai province
Defunct airports in Thailand
Airports established in 1926
Airports disestablished in 1992